Andrew Robertson (born 17 December 1990) is an English sprinter. He competed in the 60 metres at the 2016 IAAF World Indoor Championships and also at the 2018 IAAF World Indoor Championships. He is also a two time British indoor champion over 60m.

Competition record

Personal bests
Outdoor
100 metres – 10.10 (+1.9 m/s, Bedford 2014)
200 metres – 20.76 (+1.1 m/s, Loughborough 2013)
Indoor
60 metres – 6.54 (Sheffield 2016)

References

External links
 

1990 births
Living people
People from Grantham
British male sprinters
English male sprinters
Commonwealth Games medallists in athletics
Athletes (track and field) at the 2014 Commonwealth Games
World Athletics Championships athletes for Great Britain
Commonwealth Games silver medallists for England
21st-century English people
Medallists at the 2014 Commonwealth Games